UKL may refer to:
 BMW UKL platform, an automobile platform used in BMW and Mini vehicles
 Coffey County Airport, a public-use airport in Kansas
 Ukraine Air Alliance, a Ukrainian airline
 Ursula K. Le Guin (1929–2018), an American novelist
 UK Loggers, competitive woodchopping organisation